Biebesheim am Rhein is a municipality in Groß-Gerau district in Hesse, Germany.

Geography

Location 
Biebesheim am Rhein lies in the Hessisches Ried, the northeastern section of the Rhine rift, west of Darmstadt and north of Worms. Frankfurt am Main is about 50 km away.

Neighbouring communities 
Biebesheim borders in the north on the community of Stockstadt, in the east on the town of Riedstadt, in the south on the town of Gernsheim, and in the west on the communities of Hamm, Eich and Gimbsheim (all in Alzey-Worms).

Constituent communities 
Biebesheim has only one constituent community.

Politics

Municipal council 

Biebesheim's council is made up of 31 councillors, with seats apportioned thus, in accordance with municipal elections held on 26 March 2006:

Note: FWB is a citizens' coalition.

Coat of arms 
Biebesheim's civic coat of arms might heraldically be described thus: In gules a horseshoe, ends downturned, argent.

The heraldic charge – the horseshoe – is known from a village seal dating from 1546, but could be older than that. The actual arms bearing the horseshoe from the old seal were granted in 1926.

Partnerships 
Biebesheim maintains partnership links with:
  Romilly-sur-Andelle, département of Eure, Normandy, France since 1971
  Palo-del-Colle near Bari, Italy since 1986

Sightseeing 
Bordering on Biebesheim's north is the Kühkopf-Knoblochsaue nature reserve, a piece of floodplain and wetland surrounded by the Rhine and the Old Rhine.

Economy and infrastructure

Established enterprises 
Biebesheim is a HIM GmbH location, the central incineration facility for toxins and industrial waste in Hesse.

References

External links 
 Biebesheim am Rhein
 Aerial photograph

Groß-Gerau (district)
Grand Duchy of Hesse